The 2015 season will be the 80th season of competitive association football in the Faroe Islands.

National teams

Men

Senior

Exhibitions 

none announced

UEFA Euro Qualification

Women

Domestic Leagues

Faroe Islands Premier League

References